Lophiocharon is a genus of frogfishes native to the Indian Ocean and western Pacific Ocean.

Species
There are currently three recognized species in this genus:
 Lophiocharon hutchinsi Pietsch, 2004 (Hutchins' anglerfish)
 Lophiocharon lithinostomus D. S. Jordan & R. E. Richardson, 1908 (Marble-mouthed frogfish)
 Lophiocharon trisignatus J. Richardson, 1844 (Three-spot frogfish)

References

Antennariidae
Marine fish genera
Taxa named by Gilbert Percy Whitley